Spectamen venustum is an extinct species of sea snail, a marine gastropod mollusk, in the family Solariellidae.

Distribution
This species occurs in New Zealand.

References

 Maxwell, P.A. (1969) Middle Tertiary Mollusca from North Otago and South Canterbury, New Zealand. Transactions of the Royal Society of New Zealand, Earth Science, 6, 155–185, 3 pls.

External links
 Williams S.T., Kano Y., Warén A. & Herbert D.G. (2020). Marrying molecules and morphology: first steps towards a reevaluation of solariellid genera (Gastropoda: Trochoidea) in the light of molecular phylogenetic studies. Journal of Molluscan Studies. 86(1): 1–26

Solariellidae